The 2022–23 Dartmouth Big Green women's basketball team represented Dartmouth College during the 2022–23 NCAA Division I women's basketball season. The Big Green, led by second-year head coach Adrienne Shibles, played their home games at Leede Arena and were members of the Ivy League. They finished the season at 2–26, 0–14 to finish in last place. The Big Green failed to qualify for the Ivy League women's tournament.

Previous season
Dartmouth finished the previous season 3–23, 2–12 in Ivy League play to finish in seventh place. They failed to qualify for the 2022 Ivy League women's basketball tournament.

Roster

Schedule

|-
!colspan=9 style=| Non-conference regular season

|-
!colspan=9 style=| Ivy League regular season

See also
 2022–23 Dartmouth Big Green men's basketball team

References

Dartmouth Big Green women's basketball seasons
Dartmouth
Dartmouth Big Green women's
Dartmouth